This is a list of ambassadors to the Kingdom of Denmark. The Kingdom of Denmark as a sovereign state compromising the three constituent countries: Denmark, Greenland and the Faroe Islands. Note that some ambassadors are responsible for more than one country while others are directly accredited to Copenhagen.

Current Ambassadors to Copenhagen

See also
 Foreign relations of Denmark
 Foreign relations of the Faroe Islands
 Foreign relations of Greenland
 List of diplomatic missions of the Kingdom of Denmark
 List of diplomatic missions in the Kingdom of Denmark

References

   Ministry of Foreign Affairs of Denmark - Diplomatic Missions
  Ministry of Foreign Affairs of Denmark - Order of Precedence
  Ministry of Foreign Affairs of Denmark - Other missions and organisations

Denmark diplomacy-related lists
list
Denmark